Lieftinckia is a genus of white-legged damselfly in the family Platycnemididae. There are about seven described species in Lieftinckia.

Species
These seven species belong to the genus Lieftinckia:
 Lieftinckia isabellae Lieftinck, 1987
 Lieftinckia kimminsi Lieftinck, 1963
 Lieftinckia lairdi Lieftinck, 1963
 Lieftinckia malaitae Lieftinck, 1987
 Lieftinckia ramosa Lieftinck, 1987
 Lieftinckia salomonis Kimmins, 1957
 Lieftinckia ulunorum Marinov, 2016

References

Further reading

 
 
 

Platycnemididae
Articles created by Qbugbot